Maurice N. Harvey (born January 14, 1956) is a former professional American football safety in the National Football League. He played seven seasons for the Denver Broncos, the Green Bay Packers, the Detroit Lions, and the Tampa Bay Buccaneers.

1956 births
Living people
Players of American football from Cincinnati
American football safeties
Ball State Cardinals football players
Denver Broncos players
Green Bay Packers players
Detroit Lions players
Tampa Bay Buccaneers players
National Football League replacement players